Clay (born August 12, 1999), known online as Dream, is an American YouTuber and Twitch streamer who is known primarily for creating Minecraft content.

Dream has been active online since 2014, but did not gain substantial popularity until 2019, with the release of his "Minecraft Manhunt" YouTube series. Dream has also gained notability for his Minecraft speedruns, however several of his records were struck down due to allegations of cheating, which he did later admitted to have done accidentally. Content created in the Dream SMP, Dream's invite-only survival multiplayer (SMP) Minecraft server that stars content creators engaged in roleplay, has also attracted considerable attention and a popular fandom.

, his seven YouTube channels have collectively reached over  million subscribers and over  billion views, and his two Twitch channels have collectively gained  million followers and  million views. YouTube awarded Dream the Streamy Award for Gaming in both 2020 and 2021.

Dream revealed his face for the first time on October 2, 2022, after six years of staying hidden in his videos.

Career

YouTube 
Dream created his YouTube account on February 8, 2014, and started to upload content regularly in July 2019. The oldest video on Dream's account that is still accessible involves him playing the game Minecraft poorly on purpose in order to "trigger" viewers. As of December 2022, the video has amassed 18 million views.

In July 2019, Dream figured out the seed of a Minecraft world YouTuber PewDiePie was playing on by using reverse engineering techniques that Dream learned from online forums. In November 2019, Dream uploaded a viral video titled "Minecraft, But Item Drops Are Random And Multiplied…" that has amassed 49 million views as of January 2021. In January 2020, Dream uploaded a video in which he and another YouTuber, GeorgeNotFound, connected an Arduino board to an electric dog collar, which emitted an electric shock whenever a player lost health in Minecraft.

In December 2020, in place of their annual YouTube Rewind series, YouTube released a list of their top-trending videos and creators. On the U.S. list, YouTube ranked Dream's "Minecraft Speedrunner VS 3 Hunters GRAND FINALE" video as the number seven "Top Trending Video", and ranked Dream as the number two "Top Creator" and number one "Breakout Creator". A livestream by Dream on YouTube in November 2020 with about 700,000 peak viewers was the 6th highest viewed gaming stream of all time as of January 2021. A December 2020 Polygon article stated that "2020 has been a tremendous year for Dream", describing him as "YouTube's biggest gaming channel of the moment".

In a January 2021 article, Steven Asarch of Business Insider attributed Dream's growth during 2019 and 2020 "to his understanding of the YouTube algorithm", noting that "[h]e puts his keywords in the right places, capitalizes on trends, and makes thumbnails that fans want to click on."

Dream is a member of the "Dream Team", along with fellow YouTubers Sapnap and GeorgeNotFound. The group frequently collaborate to create new content. Dream also had a friendly rivalry with fellow Minecraft YouTuber Technoblade before his death, as they each had a contested recognition for the title of "best Minecraft player".

Minecraft Manhunt 

Dream's most popular YouTube series is "Minecraft Manhunt", a format where one player — usually Dream — attempts to complete a speedrun of Minecraft without death, while another player or team of players (the "hunters") attempts to kill the runner or thwart their progress. The first video in the series, titled "Beating Minecraft But My Friend Tries to Stop Me", was published on December 26, 2019. Further videos were published in the following years, featuring incrementally greater numbers of hunters. The final episode of the series was published on February 26, 2022.

Many of the Minecraft Manhunt videos have received tens of millions of views, with one of them ranking sixth in YouTube's Top Trending Videos of 2020. As of February 2022, the most-viewed in Dream's Minecraft Manhunt series has 108 million views.

The series has received positive acclaim. Urian B. wrote in Tech Times that Minecraft Manhunt "requires not only mastery of the terrain but also the ability to think fast on your feet while different choices present themselves with only milliseconds of time for decision making. This is something that Dream is good at, split second decision making." Nicolas Perez from Paste described Minecraft Manhunt as "an experience that leaves me slack-jawed every time", stating that the format of Minecraft Manhunt "seems to guarantee the hunters come out on top. But more often than not, Dream pulls just enough aces out of his sleeve to narrowly beat the hunters, and eventually the game." Gonzalo Cardona, writing for Ginx TV, noted that Minecraft Manhunt had "inspired cult-like montages by fans". Nathan Grayson, writing for Kotaku, said that Minecraft Manhunt had turned Dream "into a household name among Minecraft fans".

Dream SMP 

In April 2020, shortly after the release of Minecraft snapshot 20w17a, Dream and George created the Dream SMP, a private Survival Multiplayer (SMP) Minecraft server. Over time, other prominent Minecraft content creators outside of the "Dream Team" have been invited to the server, including TommyInnit, Technoblade, and Wilbur Soot.

The Dream SMP has become very well-known. Its main draw, according to fans, is the roleplay, with major events being loosely scripted in advance and most other elements being improvisation, performed live on YouTube and Twitch. Cecilia D'Anastasio of Wired described the Dream SMP as a form of live theatre and as a "Machiavellian political drama". During January 2021, over 1 million people tuned into Dream SMP livestreams.

Minecraft competitions 
Throughout 2020, Dream was a prominent participant in "Minecraft Championship", a monthly Minecraft competition organized by Noxcrew. He won first in both the 8th and 11th Minecraft Championships. In September 2020, during the 10th Minecraft Championship, he played for charity and raised around $3,400.

Music 
On February 4, 2021, Dream released his first song, entitled "Roadtrip", in collaboration with PmBata, which garnered over 25 million views on YouTube. On May 20, 2021, Dream released his second song, entitled "Mask", which garnered over 24.7 million views on YouTube. An animated music video for "Mask" was released in June of the same year, though it was later deleted. The song and music video received criticism about the lyrics and animation, as well as the negative depiction of prescription drugs, labelled as "normal pills". On August 19, 2021, Dream released his third song, entitled "Change My Clothes", in collaboration with American singer-songwriter Alec Benjamin, which garnered over 8.3 million views on YouTube.

Dream Burger 
On April 26, 2021, as a collaboration with Dream, fellow YouTuber MrBeast's fast-food restaurant chain MrBeast Burger released the Dream Burger as a limited-time addition to its menu.

Public image and controversies 
Dream is purported to be one of the most liked and disliked YouTubers on the platform, with a 2021 SurveyMonkey poll showing that 59.7% of respondents have a favorable view of him and 22.1% who have an unfavorable view. Dream and other members of the Dream SMP have inspired a popular fandom.

On January 1, 2021, Dream was doxed. On January 7, Dream addressed the doxing and denied accusations made against him by his ex-girlfriend.

In June 2021, Dream was criticized for announcing that all revenue generated by his streams in June would go to charity, with critics claiming he did not stream for more than a single day that month. Dream had streamed multiple times on different platforms during the month of June, including at least four streams on Discord, where he encouraged fans to subscribe and donate to his Twitch channel. On June 30, 2021, Dream announced that he had donated US$140,000 (US$90,000 from fan contributions and US$50,000 from the Dream Team) to The Trevor Project, an LGBT youth charity.

In response to fellow YouTuber Technoblade's cancer diagnosis, Dream donated US$21,409 to cancer research in late August 2021.

During his career, the Federal Bureau of Investigation (FBI) reached out to him about a "threat" against his life.

Speedrun cheating scandal 
In early October 2020, Dream livestreamed himself speedrunning Minecraft, and submitted one of his times to speedrun.com. He was awarded with 5th place at the time in the "1.16+ random seed glitchless" category. Accusations of Dream cheating in these speedruns first arose on October 16, when another Minecraft speedrunner, in now-deleted Twitter posts, reported seeing higher drop rates for key items in one of the speedrunning attempts that Dream submitted. Dream responded on October 29 in now-deleted Twitter posts, arguing that he had no reason to cheat, that he did not possess the coding knowledge to raise drop rates, and that the data was cherry picked.

On December 11, 2020, following a two-month investigation, speedrun.com's Minecraft verification team removed his submission from the leaderboards. The team published a report, along with a 14-minute video to YouTube, analyzing six archived livestreams of speedrunning sessions by Dream from around the time of the record. The team concluded that the game had been modified to make the chance of obtaining certain items needed to complete the game higher than normal; they argued the odds of obtaining the items in a legitimate way were 1 in 7.5 trillion. In response, Dream called the investigation clickbait and claimed that it was flawed enough that some members of speedrun.com's moderation team threatened to quit over it. Speedrun.com moderator Geosquare denied the accusation, saying: "All moderators voted unanimously in our decision and no one is threatening to leave in protest", and "From everything we know[,] that [claim] is unsubstantiated or complete hyperbole."

In a YouTube video, Dream maintained that the accusations of his cheating were untrue. In response to the report by speedrun.com, Dream commissioned a report by an anonymous statistician, who Dream claimed was an astrophysicist, that argued the actual odds of Dream obtaining the items legitimately were 1 in 10 million. Dot Esports said that the report did not exonerate him, and "at most" it suggested it was not impossible that he was lucky. The moderation team stood by their ruling and issued a rebuttal to Dream's report. In a Twitter post, Dream indicated that he would accept their decision without admitting fault. On February 4, 2021, Matt Parker, a YouTube personality and recreational mathematician, published a 40-minute video on the controversy supporting the conclusions of the moderators, estimating the actual odds of being 1 in 20 sextillion (2 × 1022).

On May 30, 2021, in a written statement, Dream stated that he had in fact been using a "disallowed modification" that altered item drop probabilities, although he maintained that the addition of the modification was unintentional. According to him, this discrepancy was a result of an unknown change to a client mod written for his YouTube channel. In his statement, he said that the item modifications were changed by the developer of the mod, and said that he was unaware of the addition until February 2021. After becoming aware of the addition, he deleted his video response to the speedrun.com moderators. Dream explained that he did not mention his discovery of the addition publicly back then because he "felt like the community had been through enough drama and that it was pointless". He also "didn't want to be the center of controversy for the hundredth time" and that he figured "it would be a story I would tell in a few years when no one really cared."

In a 2021 interview with YouTuber Anthony Padilla, Dream said that he regretted his initial reaction to the cheating scandal, saying that "I handled the situation horribly. When it originally came out, my response was, You guys are idiots, blah blah blah." When asked by Padilla how he thought he should have handled the scandal, Dream said that "I should have shut off all my devices for a couple days and been like, OK, let me not react with emotion."

Personal life 
Having not revealed his face until 2022, Dream's real-life identity and many aspects of his personal life are unknown. An American, he was born with the first name "Clay" on August 12, 1999, and, as of 2022, resides in Orlando, Florida, with fellow internet personalities GeorgeNotFound and Sapnap. Dream has spoken publicly about his diagnosis with ADHD. His anonymous avatar was inspired by a picture his former girlfriend posted on Discord.

On September 19, 2022, Dream stated that the next YouTube video he would upload would be him revealing his face to the public for the first time. He revealed his face in said YouTube video, titled "hi, I'm Dream.", thirteen days later, on October 2, 2022. Dream decided to do a face reveal because he wanted to meet up with friends, explore making new types of content, and do more work outside of his home. He also said that he would post "more IRL content" but does not "plan on adding a face cam" to his Minecraft videos. Dream's face reveal prompted both positive and negative comments online. His face reveal video garnered over 21.9 million views and 2.5 million likes in less than a day.  the video has over 53.5 million views and over 4.3 million likes, making it the 13th-most-viewed video on Dream's YouTube channel.

According to Time magazine, "Dream's anonymity has been one of the most alluring aspects of his persona online and that intrigue, paired with his vibrant personality, have helped him build a loyal following across social media platforms." In a 2021 interview with YouTuber Anthony Padilla, Dream said that, while he did not intend to be anonymous, it became too important a part of his online persona for him to abandon at the time.

Dream is a supporter of the University of Oklahoma's athletic teams (known as the Oklahoma Sooners), as he frequently sports Sooners jerseys during public appearances.

Discography

Awards and nominations

Filmography

Music video

See also 
 List of YouTubers
 List of most-followed Twitch channels
 List of video games notable for speedrunning

References

Notes

Further reading 

  Alt URL
  Alt URL
  Alt URL
  Alt URL

External links 
 
 

1999 births
2014 establishments
21st-century American male singers
21st-century American singers
American YouTubers
English-language YouTube channels
Gaming-related YouTube channels
Internet memes introduced in 2019
Internet-related controversies
Living people
People from Orlando, Florida
Streamy Award winners
Twitch (service) streamers
Video game controversies
Video game speedrunners
YouTube channels launched in 2014
YouTube controversies
The Game Awards winners
American agnostics
Singers from Orlando, Florida
Minecraft YouTubers
Minecraft controversies